Gluta cambodiana is a shrub/small tree in the family Anacardiaceae. It occurs in parts of Mainland Southeast Asia. Its wood is used for pickets and fuel.

Description, habitat, distribution
The species grows as a shrub or a small tree, some 4-10m tall, in secondary formations of Peninsular Malaysia, Thailand, Cambodia and Laos.
In central Cambodia, it occurs in the understorey of dry deciduous forest, and has an average wood density of 0.635g/cm3, and a water content of 0.378g/cm3.

Vernacular names, use
In Khmer the taxa is known as kânh chhrôôl, its trunk is often used in Cambodia for pickets, while its twigs are used for firewood. The sap of the plant is an alternative source of lacquer.

History
The French botanist Jean Baptiste Louis Pierre published the taxa in his Flore Forestiere de la Cochinchine in 1897.

Further reading
Chayamarit, K. (2010). Flora of Thailand 10(3): 265–329. The Forest Herbarium, Royal Forest Department.
Dy Phon, P. (2000). Dictionnaire des plantes utilisées au Cambodge: 1–915. chez l'auteur, Phnom Penh, Cambodia.
Govaerts, R. (2003). World Checklist of Seed Plants Database in ACCESS G: 1–40325.
Newman, M., Ketphanh, S., Svengsuksa, B., Thomas, P., Sengdala, K., Lamxay, V. & Armstrong, K. (2007). A checklist of the vascular plants of Lao PDR: 1–394. Royal Botanic Gardens, Edinburgh.

References

cambodiana
Flora of Indo-China
Flora of Peninsular Malaysia
Plants described in 1897